Soft ball or softball can refer to:

 Softball, a form of team sport similar to baseball
 Softball squash, the international form of squash, as distinguished from hardball squash, the North American form
 Softball cricket, a form of cricket using an alternative cricket ball
 Soft-ball stage, a stage in candy-making corresponding to 85% sugar
 Softball (band), a Japanese all-girl punk band